Oktyabr ('October'), was a Yiddish language newspaper published from Minsk 1917–1941.

Oktyabr was launched on November 7, 1925, on the eighth anniversary of the October Revolution, replacing the ex-Bundist newspaper Der Veker. The name of the new publication was unequivocally Bolshevik, in contrast with the Bundist legacy of Der Veker. As of 1925 Oktyabr had a circulation of 4,139, by 1926 it stood at 6,400 and by 1927 its circulation stood at 7,150, higher than any of the Belorussian language party organs. Publishing of Oktyabr continued until the German invasion of the Soviet Union.

References

1941 disestablishments in the Soviet Union
Bundism in Europe
Jewish anti-Zionism in Belarus
Jewish anti-Zionism in the Soviet Union
Jews and Judaism in Minsk
Publications established in 1925
Yiddish communist newspapers
Mass media in Minsk
Publications disestablished in 1941
Yiddish culture in Belarus